Theodore Koehler (July 30, 1856 – March 27, 1929) was a German-American politician and accountant.

Life 
Koehler was born on July 30, 1856, in Ahrensbök, Province of Schleswig-Holstein, the son of Theodore Koehler and Dorothea von Koepke. His maternal grandfather was knighted by Frederick VII of Denmark for valuable services rendered to the state, and his father was decorated with the Iron Cross for brave conduct in battle. When he was born, Schleswig-Holstein was still part of Denmark but was later taken by Germany.

From 1871 to 1876, Koehler worked with a business house in Luebeck. In 1876, he joined the German Army as a sharpshooter. He then received a letter from a friend who previously immigrated to America that encouraged him to do the same. He received a discharge from the army and in 1876 arrived in Philadelphia, Pennsylvania, only to find out his friend had died. He spent the next several years working in various occupations, and in 1883 he was employed by an English firm to participate in an exploring expedition in South America. He represented the firm a year later at the World Cotton Centennial in New Orleans. In 1885, he became the head bookkeeper and auditor of a large industrial firm in Long Island City, New York. He was later appointed by Long Island City officials to examine and report on the condition of the city books. He was a strong advocate for a tunnel under Newtown Creek. He was elected town supervisor of Long Island City in 1892, and went on to serve as town supervisor for the next three years. By 1896, he was editor, cashier, and chief accountant for the East River Gas Company.

In 1895, Koehler was elected to the New York State Senate as a Democrat, representing New York's 2nd State Senate district (Queens County). He served in the Senate in 1896, 1897, and 1898. While in the Senate, he helped pass the first certified public accountant law in the United States, signed by Governor Morton in 1896. He then organized and incorporated the New York School of Accounts, the country's first institution to help students receive a C.P.A. degree, and he directed the school for 25 years. He also became head of his own accounting organization for 30 years, specializing in factory cost accounts, and authored a few accounting books. He was one of the oldest members of the Institute of Accounts of the City of New York, and was a member of the Society of Certified Public Accountants of the State of New York and the National Society of Public Accountants.

Koehler was a member of the Freemasons and the Shriners. In 1877, he married Bernardine Helmce of New Jersey. He later married Theodora Daub. Theodora was the first woman to receive a C.P.A. certificate, a member of Koehler's staff for several years, and co-author of one of his books.

Koehler died at his Astoria home on March 27, 1929. He was buried in Oakland Cemetery in Yonkers.

References

External links 

 The Political Graveyard
 Theodore Koehler at Find a Grave

1856 births
1929 deaths
Politicians from Lübeck
German emigrants to the United States
American accountants
People from Long Island City, Queens
Politicians from Queens, New York
People from Astoria, Queens
19th-century American politicians
Democratic Party New York (state) state senators
American Freemasons
Burials in New York (state)